This is a list of notable streets and squares in Stuttgart, Germany.

Streets

Squares

Notes

Citations

References

 

Geography of Stuttgart